Karl Taillepierre (born 13 August 1976, in Pointe-à-Pitre, Guadeloupe) is a French triple jumper.

His personal best jump is 17.45 metres, achieved in July 2005 in Angers. This result places him third on the all-time French performers list, behind Serge Hélan and Teddy Tamgho.

Competition record

References

External links

1976 births
Living people
French male triple jumpers
Athletes (track and field) at the 2004 Summer Olympics
Olympic athletes of France
Athletes (track and field) at the 2001 Mediterranean Games
Athletes (track and field) at the 2013 Mediterranean Games
Mediterranean Games competitors for France